Daquin is a surname. Notable people with the surname include:

Dominique Daquin (born 1972), French volleyball player
Frédéric Daquin (born 1978), French footballer
Louis Daquin (1908–1980), French film director and actor
Louis-Claude Daquin (1694–1772), French classical composer